The Boston Municipal Protective Services Department (BMPS) is a former police agency that patrols properties owned and controlled by the City of Boston, the successor agency to the Boston Municipal Police (BMP). The primary responsibility of the agency is to enforce all laws of the Commonwealth of Massachusetts and ordinances of the City of Boston on and within all properties owned and operated by the City of Boston. It is an agency of Boston's Property & Construction Management Department.

History
The Boston Municipal Police was founded in 1979, so the former Public Facilities Department (now known as Property Management) had a fully functional police force to respond to alarms in schools and other city properties when the city was experiencing many problems due to the busing situation. The department originally consisted of unarmed officers; over time, the department grew to have both unarmed (site officers) and armed officers (patrol and superior officers).

In mid-2006, Mayor Thomas M. Menino organized a forced merger of the Boston Police and the Boston Municipal Police, which granted Boston Municipal patrol officers the opportunity to apply to the Boston Police Department as lateral transfers, although employment was not a guarantee. This prompted protest from the Boston Police Patrolmen's Association (BPPA). Unlike members of the BPPA, the Boston Municipal Police were not civil service officers. None of the BMP officers had to pass a civil service exam to get hired, as BPPA members did for the BPD. BMP officers were politically connected positions, and by-passed thousands on the Massachusetts Civil Service Exam hiring list for the City of Boston, including veterans and minorities. BMP officers did not attend the full six-month Boston Police Academy that BPPA members had. Despite the BPPA's objections, 33 BMP officers who passed a vigorous background check, medical and psychological exam, as well as a physical agility test, were transferred to the Boston Police Department on December 31, 2006. On January 1, 2007, the rest of them were either laid off or permitted to reapply to the city's Municipal Protective Services Department as site officers. Boston Municipal Police was dissolved at 12 a.m. on January 1, 2007, and replaced on the same day by the BMPS. It is currently an unarmed security force.

Jurisdiction

BMP patrol officers had jurisdiction citywide and were sworn Special Police Officers under Boston Police Department Rule 400A with full police powers. Now as the BMPS, the officers are limited to patrolling specific "sites" located throughout the city, but still hold full police powers and are licensed as Special Police Officers despite being unarmed. Their authority is derived from the Boston Police Commissioner. The main agencies and departments serviced by BMPS include the following city-owned assets:

Boston Police Department property
Boston Redevelopment Authority property
Community Schools property and employees
Community Centers property and employees
Economic Development and Industrial Corporation (EDIC) property and employees
Inspectional Services Department property and employees
Library Department property and employees
Property Management and Construction property and employees
Neighborhood Development property and employees
Boston Public Schools Central Administration Building
The City of Boston Cemeteries
The city's Parks and Recreation facilities and employees
The Boston Transportation Department property and employees

See also
Boston Police Department

References

External links 
 City Hall Security
 Boston Globe Article

Boston Police Department
Government of Boston
Specialist police departments of Massachusetts
1979 establishments in Massachusetts